Television in Latvia was first tested in 1937 and introduced in 1954. Latvia was the first country in the Baltic States which started broadcasting.

Initial research into television broadcasting in Latvia started in 1932, and the first experimental broadcast of television in Latvia took place on 10 November 1937 during a public viewing at the Latvian Radio Society in Riga, using an amateur-made oscilloscope with the screen size of 45x50 cm. A Philips custom-built Nipkow disk transmitter used a frequency channel provide by the Department of the Post and Telegraph (Pasta un telegrāfa departaments, PTD) to transmit moving images with the speed of 12,5 frames per second. There were plans to launch regular broadcasts of "visual radio" by the Latvian Radiophone in the early 1940s, but these were suspended by the occupation of Latvia and World War II.

The first contemporary test broadcasts started on 6 November 1954 from a studio in Soviet Riga in black-and-white, which were seen by all 20 then-owners of television sets. Regular scheduled broadcasting of Latvian Television (LTV) started on 20 November 1954 with a premiere of the 1954 Soviet Latvian war epic Victorious Return. At the beginning, LTV didn't have rights to create their own programming except live shows. In 1955, the Riga Television studio in Nometņu iela, Āgenskalns was created to produce its own programming and the first TV tower in Latvia was built. In 1986, a new TV building and broadcasting tower were unveiled in Zaķusala.

Since 1991, the first private television studios started broadcasting. Color television was introduced in 1974. At the beginning, color system used was SECAM and only color programming that was available in color, was a retransmission of the Moscow Central Television. But in 1998 SECAM was swapped for PAL. Digital television was started testing in May 2002 and all terrestrial analogue stations stopped broadcasting on 1 June 2010 after introducing it. Advertising on public broadcasters, such as Latvian Television (LTV) was phased out on 1 January 2021.

The independent, state budget-financed National Electronic Mass Media Council (NEPLP) is the national media watchdog (similar to Ofcom in UK).

Most of the non-Latvian television programs are dubbed, some are subtitled, but some are both dubbed and subtitled. This is a list of television channels that broadcast for a Latvian language audience.

TV Channels

Local / regional / international TV stations
TV Kurzeme – only in Liepāja
Lemon TV – Cable TV (Latvia), DVB-T – only in Vidzeme area
LRT – Latgale Regional Television (only in Latgale)
Kurzemes TV – only in Kurzeme
OTV (Ogres TV) – only in Ogre
LRT+ – cable TV, only in Daugavpils
Valmieras TV – only in Valmiera
TV Viļāni – only in Viļāni 
VTV (Vidzemes TV) – only in Vidzeme

Defunct channels 
MTV Latvia  - Interrupted broadcast at November 2009 due to budget issues. Later replaced with MTV Lithuania & Latvia, which closed at the end of 2009 due to this same budget issues.
RBS TV  - Interrupted broadcast in October 1995.
LZK (Latvia) (Latvijas Ziņu kanāls – Latvian News Channel)  - Announced defunct at 9 December 2011.
TV5  - Interrupted broadcast on 31 March 2016 due to budget issues.
LNT  -  Interrupted broadcast in 28 February due to rebranded television model in TV3 Group. Channel got replaced by TV3 Life on 1 March 2020.
Kanāls 2  -  Interrupted broadcast in 28 February due to rebranded television model in TV3 Group. Channel got replaced by TV3 Mini on 1 March 2020.
Sportacentrs.com TV - Interrupted broadcast at January 1st 2022, with all sports programs of the channel moving to TV4.
PBK Igaunija – Estonian branch of the Russian Channel One, closed on 2 March 2022, after checking.
PBK Lithuania - Lithuanian branch of the Russian Channel One, closed on 2 March 2022, after checking.
Dozhd (TV Rain) - Revoked license on 6th December 2022 and closed on 8th December 2022 due to violations.

References 

 
Television channels
Television